The Star Awards for Best Variety Programme is an award presented annually at the Star Awards, a ceremony that was established in 1994.

The category was introduced in 1998, at the 5th Star Awards ceremony; Comedy Night received the award and it is given in honour of a Mediacorp variety programme which has delivered an outstanding overall performance. The nominees are determined by a team of judges employed by Mediacorp; winners are selected by a majority vote from the entire judging panel.

Since its inception, the award has been given to 21 variety programmes. The Inner Circle is the most recent winner in this category. Since the ceremony held in 2019, City Beat, The Joy Truck, Say It If You Dare and GeTai Challenge remain as the only four variety programmes to win in this category twice. In addition, City Beat has been nominated on five occasions, more than any other variety programme. Food Source holds the record for most nominations without a win, with three.

Recipients

 Each year is linked to the article about the Star Awards held that year.

Category facts
Most wins

Most nominations

See also 
Star Awards
Star Awards for Best Variety Show Host

References

External links 

Star Awards